The Institute of Population Problems was a domestic assembly appointed by the Japanese Government in 1939. It helped to address the imbalance between population and resources that Japan began faced following the introduction of Western medicine. Its first major solution was an urging of the Japanese government to make contraception available, emphasising that abortion was not the best solution.

In 1996, the Institute of Population Problems merged with the Social Development Research Institute to form the National Institute of Population and Social Security Research.

External links
The Color of Democracy: A Japanese Public Health Official’s Reconnaissance Trip to the U.S. South Takeuchi-Demirci, Aiko. Southern Spaces 18 March 2011.

References

Government agencies of Japan
Population concern organizations